Havalina may refer to:
Havalina, a rock band from Long Beach, California that took its name from the song "Havalina" by Pixies 
"Havalina", a song by the band Pixies from their 1990 album Bossanova (Pixies album)
Javalina, a pig-like animal